A Christmas Carol is a 1999 British-American made-for-television film adaptation of Charles Dickens' 1843 novella A Christmas Carol that was first televised December 5, 1999, on TNT. It was directed by David Jones and stars Patrick Stewart as Ebenezer Scrooge and Richard E. Grant as Bob Cratchit. The film was produced after Patrick Stewart performed a series of successful one-man shows of A Christmas Carol on Broadway and in London.

Plot

On Christmas Eve 1843, Ebenezer Scrooge, a surly money-lender at a counting house, who has run the business himself for seven years since his business partner Jacob Marley died, does not share the merriment of Christmas. He declines his nephew Fred's invitation to join him for Christmas dinner and dismisses two gentlemen collecting money for charity. Scrooge reluctantly gives his loyal, low-paid employee Bob Cratchit Christmas off, as there will be no business for Scrooge during the day. In his house, Scrooge encounters the ghost of Marley, who warns Scrooge to repent of his wicked ways to avoid being condemned in the afterlife, as Marley has been. Marley tells Scrooge that three spirits will visit him during the next three nights, regardless of Scrooge's reluctance, and to expect the first ghost at one o'clock.

At one o'clock, Scrooge is visited by the angel-like Ghost of Christmas Past, who takes him back in time to his childhood and early adult life. They visit his lonely school days in boarding school, where his friends were all going home for Christmas but he is not allowed, because his father treated him badly after his mother died. Scrooge's sister, Fran, the mother of Scrooge's nephew, comes to Scrooge's school and their father is a lot nicer, agreeing that he could come home for Christmas. The ghost shows Scrooge became an employee of Albert Fezziwig, who had a benevolent heart and acted as a second father to Scrooge. Fezziwig throws a Christmas party, Scrooge attends and meets a young woman named Belle, with whom he falls in love and gets engaged. However, the Ghost shows Scrooge why Belle left him: he chose money over her. A tearful Scrooge extinguishes the Ghost as he finds himself back in bed.

Scrooge meets the serious Ghost of Christmas Present, which shows Scrooge the joys and wonder of Christmas Day. Scrooge and the Ghost visit Cratchit's house, learning his family is content with their small dinner. Scrooge takes pity on Cratchit's ill son, Tiny Tim. The Ghost ages, while commenting that Tiny Tim will likely not survive until next Christmas. Before the Ghost disappears, he warns Scrooge about the evils of "Ignorance" and "Want", who manifest themselves before Scrooge as two wretched children.

The Ghost of Christmas Yet to Come arrives, appearing as a tall, silent, black cloaked figure, and takes Scrooge into the future. At the stock exchange, Scrooge's acquaintances discuss the death of an unnamed colleague, one of whom says that he only plans to attend the funeral if lunch is provided while another man says he doesn't wear black gloves (one of the clothes of mourning) or eat lunches so there's no reason for him to be there and none of these associates expect anyone else to attend either, given how unpleasant a person the deceased was. In a den, Scrooge sees a charwoman Mrs. Dilber, a laundress Mrs. Riggs, and the local undertaker trading several of the man's stolen possessions to a rag-and-bone man named Old Joe. A young couple, who owed the man money, are relieved he is dead, as they have more time to pay off their debt. The Ghost transports Scrooge to Cratchit's house, discovering Tiny Tim has died and the Crachits are mourning him. The Ghost escorts Scrooge to a cemetery, where the Ghost points out the man’s grave, revealing Scrooge was the man who died. Realizing this, Scrooge vows to change his ways just as the Ghost closes it eyes and lifts it head. The grave opens, and Scrooge sees his dead self lying in a coffin. He falls into the grave, then clings to his own dead body as he falls through the earth into Hell, suddenly finding himself in his bedroom. Scrooge finds the ghosts had visited him all in one night instead of three. Finding it is Christmas Day, a gleeful Scrooge decides to surprise Bob's family with a turkey dinner, and ventures out among the citizens of London to spread happiness in the city. He visits Fred's house and has Christmas dinner with the family, followed by dancing. The following day, he gives Cratchit a raise and becomes like "a second father" to Tiny Tim, who escapes death. Scrooge and Tiny Tim and the Cratchits celebrate Christmas.

Inspiration
Rather than deliberately trying to resemble either the 1938 MGM version or the 1984 George C. Scott made-for-TV version, this 1999 film takes as its inspiration the 1951 film version with Alastair Sim in the grimness of some of its scenes and set design.

Main cast
 Patrick Stewart – Ebenezer Scrooge
 Richard E. Grant – Bob Cratchit
 Joel Grey – Spirit of Christmas Past
 Ian McNeice – Albert Fezziwig (Ian McNeice would go onto play Edward Chapman in 2017's The Man Who Invented Christmas)
 Saskia Reeves – Mrs. Cratchit
 Desmond Barrit – Spirit of Christmas Present
 Bernard Lloyd – Jacob Marley's Ghost
 Dominic West – Fred
 Trevor Peacock – Old Joe
 Liz Smith – Mrs. Dilber (Charwoman) 
 Elizabeth Spriggs – Mrs. Riggs (Laundress) 
 Kenny Doughty – Young Ebenezer Scrooge
 Laura Fraser – Belle
 Celia Imrie – Mrs. Bennett
 John Franklyn-Robbins – Mister Crump (Undertaker)
 Ben Tipper — Tiny Tim Cratchit
 Claire Slater – Martha Cratchit
 Barnaby Francis – Young Boy Cratchit
 Tabitha Francis – Young Girl Cratchit
 Tim Potter – Spirit of Christmas Future
 Jeremy Swift – Mr. Williams
 Rosie Wiggins – Fran (Scrooge's sister) 
 Crispin Letts – Topper Haines
 Helen Coker – Betsy

Liz Smith had also played Mrs. Dilber in the 1984 made-for-television film.

Critical reception
In a positive review, Variety wrote:
 "Oft-told tales are difficult to pull off, but ... this one gets it right ... Director David Jones displays a smooth hand that adds mounds of style to the rendition, and his approach to Peter Barnes’ script is a tribute to delicate staging ... Stewart as Scrooge is such a perfect piece of casting that it will be hard to imagine anyone else as the sour ol’ tightwad in years to come."
The New York Times also gave the film a positive review.

Awards
Patrick Stewart was nominated for Outstanding Performance by a Male Actor in a Miniseries or Television Movie at the Screen Actors Guild Awards in 2000. Ian Wilson was nominated for Outstanding Cinematography at the Emmy Awards in 2000.

See also
 List of Christmas films
 List of ghost films
 Adaptations of A Christmas Carol

References

External links
 
 
 

1999 television films
1999 films
American Christmas films
British Christmas films
British television films
Christmas television films
Films based on A Christmas Carol
Television shows based on A Christmas Carol
Films scored by Stephen Warbeck
Films directed by David Jones
Films set in 1836
Films set in 1843
Films set in the Victorian era
Ghosts in television
TNT Network original films